The governor of Krasnoyarsk Krai heads the executive branch in Krasnoyarsk Krai, a federal subject of Russia.

History of office 
On 29 December 1991 the president of Russia Boris Yeltsin appointed Arkady Veprev as the head of Krasnoyarsk Krai Administration. Veprev, a 64-year old former sovkhoz chairman, who was hostile to privatization, went on a conflict with local legislature and was forced to resign less than 13 months after his appointment. Veprev named economist Valery Zubov as his successor. In April 1993 Zubov was elected governor. Five years later, he lost to General Alexander Lebed, who received about 60% of the vote in the runoff.

After Lebed died in a helicopter crash in April 2002, the early election was set up for 8 September. Alexander Khloponin, governor of Taymyr, won that campaign. In 2007 he was reappointed by president Vladimir Putin as Krasnoyarsk Krai was reorganized by annexation of Taymyr and Evenk Autonomous Okrugs.

List of officeholders

References 

Politics of Krasnoyarsk Krai
Krasnoyarsk